Ilya Mikhalyov (born 31 July 1990) is a Russian former football forward.

References

External links
 

1990 births
Living people
Ukrainian footballers
Russian footballers
Naturalised citizens of Russia
Association football forwards
Ukrainian expatriate footballers
Russian Premier League players
Ukrainian Premier League players
FC Amkar Perm players
FC Olimpik Donetsk players
FC Karpaty Lviv players
FC Oleksandriya players
FC Khimki players
FC Tom Tomsk players
FC Tosno players
FC Aktobe players
FC Kolkheti-1913 Poti players
FC Luch Vladivostok players
FC Neftekhimik Nizhnekamsk players
FC Shevardeni-1906 Tbilisi players
FC Guria Lanchkhuti players
Expatriate footballers in Kazakhstan
Expatriate footballers in Georgia (country)
Expatriate footballers in Armenia
Ukrainian expatriate sportspeople in Kazakhstan
Ukrainian expatriate sportspeople in Georgia (country)
Ukrainian expatriate sportspeople in Armenia
Sportspeople from Makiivka